Nicholas Lechmere Charlton (18 December 1733 – 20 March 1807), known as Nicholas Lechmere until 1784, was a British politician, MP for Worcester in 1774.

Lechmere was the son of Edmund Lechmere  (1710–1805), and his first wife Elizabeth, daughter of Sir Blunden Charlton, 3rd Bt. Edmund Lechmere  (1747–1798) was Lechmere's younger brother; Sir Anthony Lechmere, 1st Bt. (1766–1849) was his younger half-brother.

He was educated by Mr. Graham at Hackney, and matriculated at Trinity College, Cambridge in 1751.

Following the death in 1773 of Henry Crabb-Boulton, MP for Worcester, Thomas Bates Rous was elected to take his seat in a by-election. However, Rous was unseated on petition for bribery, and in the resulting by-election in February 1774, Lechmere was elected. He was counted by the government as a supporter. He did not contest the October 1774 general election, at which Rous retook the seat.

He succeeded to the estates of his uncle Sir Francis Charlton, 4th Bt., and took the additional name Charlton, in 1784.

He resided at Ludford, where for 24 years he was a colonel in the Worcester Militia.

He died on 20 March 1807.

Family
He married Susanna, daughter of Jesson Case of Powick. They had two sons and a daughter:
 Edmund Lechmere Charlton  (1789–1845)
 Francis Lechmere Charlton (1790–1857)
 Emma Lechmere Charlton (died 1809)

References

1733 births
1807 deaths
Alumni of Trinity College, Cambridge
British MPs 1768–1774